The Oregon State Beavers are the athletic teams that represent Oregon State University, located in Corvallis, Oregon. The Beavers compete at the National Collegiate Athletic Association (NCAA) Division I (Football Bowl Subdivision (FBS) for college football) level as a member of the Pac-12 Conference. Oregon State's mascot is Benny the Beaver. Both the men's and women's teams share the name, competing in 7 NCAA Division I men's sports and 9 NCAA Division I women's sports respectively. The official colors for the athletics department are Beaver Orange (Pantone 165), black, and white.

The football rivalry between the Beavers and Ducks, once known as the Civil War, was one of the longest-running in the country, having been contested 123 times through the 2019 season. Other regional rivals include the Washington Huskies and Washington State Cougars.

As of June 2018, the Beavers have won one pre-NCAA team national championship and four NCAA team national championships. The 1926 wrestling team won the Amateur Athletic Union national championship, the 1961 men's Cross-country team won the NCAA title, and most recently the baseball team won the 2006, 2007 College World Series and 2018 College World Series. Other notable performances include a second-place finish in the 1973 and 1995 NCAA wrestling finals, two Final Four appearances by the men's basketball team, one Final Four appearance by the women's basketball team, the football team defeating Notre Dame by a 32-point margin in the 2001 Fiesta Bowl (and finishing the season ranked #4 in the polls), seven appearances in the College World Series by the baseball program, and several individual NCAA championship titles in gymnastics, wrestling, and track & field.

Sports teams

Men's sports
Oregon State has four NCAA championships: three in baseball (2006, 2007 and 2018), and one in men's cross country (1961). The school dropped its cross country and track programs in 1988 due to budget cuts, though women's track and cross country were reinstated in 2005. Periodically, some men continue to compete individually in an unattached status.

Baseball
 

The Oregon State University baseball program was established in 1907. It has since seen dozens of players go on to play in the minor leagues and more than 20 go on to play in the majors. Most notable of these major league players are New York Yankees outfielder Jacoby Ellsbury and Los Angeles Dodgers second baseman Darwin Barney

The baseball team has won its conference championship 26 times and has reached the College World Series seven times, first in 1952 and as recently as 2018. They won the NCAA championship in 2006, 2007, and 2018. The team is led by head coach Mitch Canham and they play at Goss Stadium at Coleman Field.

Basketball
 
The men's basketball team at Oregon State experienced periods of significant success from the early 1920s to the early 1990s—with 12 conference championships, 16 NCAA Tournament appearances, and only 14 losing seasons from 1922 to 1991—but fell on hard times, suffering 19 losing seasons and made no NCAA Tournament appearances from 1992 to 2015 before returning in 2016. The program has reached the Final Four of the NCAA Tournament twice, the Elite Eight on six occasions, and 17 total tournament appearances. A number of former OSU players have gone on to have successful careers in the NBA, including 9-time NBA All-Star Gary Payton and "Iron Man" A. C. Green. OSU alumni have also won a total of 10 NBA championship rings and four Olympic gold medals. The team has defeated rival Oregon more times than any other team has beaten an opponent in a collegiate sport, with 186 victories over the Ducks as of the end of the 2016–17 season.

The basketball program has been eclipsed in recent times by the relative success of the OSU football and baseball programs, the latter of which has recently won two national championships.

Wayne Tinkle was hired as head coach prior to the 2014–15 season. His first team produced the program's second winning record in the last nine seasons and he then led the school to their first NCAA Tournament appearance since 1990 in 2016.

Football
 

Jonathan Smith is the current head coach, replacing Gary Andersen, who left the school after six games in 2017.

The football program has been a part of Oregon State University since 1893, working as a platform for over a hundred players to enter the NFL, such as Heisman Trophy winner Terry Baker and Atlanta Falcons running backs Steven Jackson and Jacquizz Rodgers, current Los Angeles Rams punter Johnny Hekker, Cincinnati Bengals wide receivers Chad Ochocinco and T. J. Houshmandzadeh, Houston Texans wide receiver Brandin Cooks, Buffalo Bills linebacker Nick Barnett, Buffalo Bills safety Jordan Poyer, Carolina Panthers quarterback Derek Anderson, Kansas City Chiefs safety Sabby Piscitelli, Tampa Bay Buccaneers wide receiver Sammie Stroughter, Miami Dolphins quarterback Matt Moore, and New England Patriots cornerback Brandon Browner.

Soccer

Oregon State men's soccer team's coach is Steve Simmons, formerly the head coach at Northern Illinois University.

Golf

Golf was first introduced as a school-sanctioned sport at Oregon State College in 1928. Prior to that date, golf existed on campus as a club sport with an organized team, but with its participants not receiving formal recognition from the university. The first coach of the OSC team was Tony Sottovia, formerly a professional player from Portland, who headed the squad for three years.

The Great Depression affected the golf program particularly leading to only one officially scheduled match 1931. Following that, there were no scheduled games for the next year. Golf again began to resurface in 1933 without official university support. In 1934, Ralph Coleman, head of OSC intramural athletics, was named golf coach. He would remain in this capacity until 1938, when he was named full-time baseball coach and basketball coach Amory T. "Slats" Gill was appointed to the position.

The golf teams practice and compete at Oregon State's own Trysting Tree Golf Club.

Rowing

Oregon State has long been a powerhouse for men's rowing, providing 13 different athletes to the highest levels of rowing in the U.S. And over the past five years, a pair of former Beavers have represented America and the Oregon State rowing program particularly well. Most recently these athletes include Josh Inman, Joey Hansen and Chris Callaghan.

Crew was established at Oregon State College on October 13, 1927, when the University of California presented two rowing shells to the school. The sport was initially organized as an intramural activity pitting the various academic classes against one another.

Throughout its history, rowing at Oregon State has been led by committed and visionary coaching. The school's first crew coach was James C. Othus, a former collegiate rower at Cornell University, who guided the program from its origin in 1927. Ed Stevens, another Cornell alumnus who had coached the Harvard University for three seasons, took over in 1932. Stevens would lead the program until 1949, during which time the Beavers gained recognition and respect as a highly competitive crew.

Karl Drlica took over from Coach Stevens and would lead the program for the next 30 years. One of Coach Drlica's first moves was to establish women as an integral part of the program when he started intramural competition in 1952. OSU was one of the first collegiate programs to support women's rowing.

The achievements of Coach Drlica and his crews were recognized in 1967 when the Board of Intercollegiate Athletics accepted the men's heavyweight crew as a varsity sport. Ten years later, Coach Drlica would orchestrate the elevation of women's and lightweight rowing to varsity status as well.

In 1983 the athletic department hired Dave Emigh to assist with the crew program and in 1985 he was named the head coach. Emigh spent 11 years at OSU and continued to develop the program with the same innovative styles of his predecessors. Under Emigh, the crew achieved stability within the athletic department and firmly established itself as a leader in West Coast rowing.

Fred Honebein joined the Oregon State family in 2004 and led his squad to a ninth-place finish at the Intercollegiate Rowing Association Championships. The Beavers’ finish marked the fifth straight year they had finished among the top ten in the nation and the eighth time in ten years.

Steve Todd has been named interim head coach of the Oregon State University men's rowing program for the 2006–07 season. Todd succeeded former head coach Fred Honebein in June after leading the Beavers to a 14th-place finish at the Intercollegiate Rowing Association national championships. A former rower at the University of Washington, Todd rowed to a national championship in the Huskies' JV8 in 1997 and earned medals in the Varsity boat in 1998 and 1999. Todd has been a part of the Oregon State rowing program for four years as the men's freshman coach. During his time with the Beavers, Todd's crews have medaled all four years at the Pac-10 Championships including a silver medal finish in 2003. Tood's 2003 crew of rookies also took second at the San Diego Crew Classic and in the process upset traditional powerhouse Washington. Most recently, Todd's Freshman 4+ finished fourth at the IRA Regatta in June.

Dave Friedericks is in his first season as the men's rowing assistant coach. Friedericks, a former member of the U.S. national team, directed the Lake Oswego Community Rowing Center for the past two years. While at Lake Oswego, Friedericks helped grow the club from a group of a dozen members to a membership of 75 with an additional 100 rowers taking classes.

The Oregon State University Men's Varsity 8+ had a 10th-place finish at the 2007 Intercollegiate Rowing Association Championships.

Wrestling

Traditionally, the Oregon State wrestling team has been a national powerhouse, winning their conference championship 49 times and finishing in the NCAA top-ten 21 times (2nd twice, in 1973 & 1995) since the inception of the team in 1909, 93 seasons. They have 12 individual NCAA championship titles and have 90 individual All-Americans (of which 2 athletes earned 4 time all-Americans by Babak Mohammadi (1991, 1992, 1994, & 1995) and Larry Bielenberg (1974–1977)). Pre-NCAA in 1926, OSU won the Amateur Athletic Association team national championship. Dale Thomas, Oregon State coach from 1957 to 1990 and National Wrestling Hall of Fame member, holds the NCAA record for most dual meet wins in a coaching career at 616. Additionally, seven OSU alumni have gone on to represent the United States in the Olympics, including in 1924 where Oregon State alumni won both the gold and silver medals in the same weight class. Only 5 of Oregon State's 90 seasons have resulted in a losing record. Oregon State's all-time dual meet record at the end of the 2009–10 season is 950–307–26, ranked 3rd in the NCAA for most all-time wins. With the retiring after the 2005–06 season of one of OSU's most successful coaches, Joe Wells, National Wrestling Hall of Fame member Jim Zalesky was named head coach, currently in his 8th season with the Beavers.

Women's sports

Basketball

The women's basketball program at Oregon State has long been a power. From the 1980s and Carol Menken, to the Mid-1990s with the teams led by Tanja Kostic that made it to the NCAA tournament. More recently Oregon State women's basketball has seen many strong players. Felicia Ragland, whose number was since retired, played for OSU in the early 2000s before a career in the WNBA. Scott Rueck has led the program to new heights in recent years, guiding the Beavers to the 2015, 2016, and 2017 Pac-12 Conference regular season titles, the 2016 Pac-12 Conference Tournament title, as well as five straight NCAA Tournament berths (2014, 2015, 2016, 2017, 2018) and a Final Four (2016).

Golf
The women's golf team has had numerous athletes to go on to play professionally. Mary Budke won the 1974 AIAW individual collegiate golf national championship.

Gymnastics

The women's gymnastics team is historically known as one of the best teams in the country. They were ranked #13 in the nation in the 2006 Preseason Coaches’ Poll, and had one of the strongest schedules in the nation. The Beavers came in second all-around at the 2006 NCAA West Regional, qualifying for the NCAA Championships hosted on their home turf at Oregon State. OSU gymnasts have won seven national championships on floor exercise and balance beam, most recently Amy Durham on floor in 1993.

Soccer

Oregon State women's soccer team's head coach is Linus Rhodes, formerly an assistant coach for eight years at OSU. 

The captains in 2008 and 2009 were Red Nixon and Najma Homidi. The 2009 Oregon State women's soccer team earned the first NCAA tournament berth in program history, and upset host Ohio State and nationally seeded Florida in the first two rounds to advance to the Sweet 16.

Softball

The women's softball team was co-champion for the Pac-10 title in 2005, ending the season with a 43–16 record. They have made NCAA regional tournament appearances eight years in a row, including the 2006 season where they made it to the Women's College World Series (WCWS). The team has appeared in the WCWS five times (1977, 1978, 1979, 2006, 2022). They were ranked #12 in the nation in the 2006 ESPN.com/USA Softball Preseason Top 25 Collegiate Poll. They had a 28-game winning streak in the 2006 season, the longest win streak the NCAA had seen since 2002 and the longest in the history of the program at Oregon State. The 28-game streak ranks 16th(t) all-time in the NCAA Division I record book for longest win streak, and the Beavers are one of just 11 teams in NCAA history to win 28 straight games.

Track and field and cross country
The Oregon State track and field and cross country programs were cut in 1988, but began a comeback in 2004 with the return of a women's distance program, led by Kelly Sullivan, the former coach of Willamette University. The Beavers compete largely in smaller, Division 3 meets, but have enjoyed some success in the Pac-12 Conference, including a ninth-place finish by Ashley Younce in the 2006 Western Regional NCAA track & field meet and recently the graduation of three-time All-American and holder of five school-records, Laura Carlyle. Men's track and field is confined to the club level, although individual male athletes from the football team have recently joined the Women's team at meets, among them Jordan Bishop was an All-American in the high jump in 2010. The completion of Phase One of the Whyte Track & Field Center is a giant step in the efforts to fully re-establish the program on both the women's and men's team.

Volleyball
Historically, a team that has competed well in the ultra-competitive Pac-12 conference, the OSU women's volleyball team has qualified for the NCAA Tournament 4 times (most recently 2017) and advanced to the Sweet 16 in 2014. The Beavers are coached by Mark Barnard.

Championships

NCAA team championships
Oregon State has won 4 NCAA team national championships.

Men's (4)
Baseball (3): 2006, 2007, 2018
Cross Country (1): 1961
see also:
Pac-12 Conference NCAA championships
List of NCAA schools with the most NCAA Division I championships

Other national team championships
The Beavers have won one national team title that was not bestowed by the NCAA:
 Men's:
Wrestling (1): 1926 (AAU)

Notable non varsity sports

Lacrosse
The Oregon State University lacrosse club was formed in 1971. They play in the MCLA.

Rugby
The Oregon State University rugby club was formed in 1961. In recent years Oregon State rugby has played in the Northwest Conference against In-Conference rivals such as Oregon, Washington and Washington State. Beginning with the 2012–13 season, however, Oregon State is leaving the Northwest Conference and joining other schools from the Pac-12 to form a new rugby conference that will mirror the Pac-12 and bring increased exposure. Oregon State rugby has been successful in recent years. The Beavers finished the 2012 season ranked #9 in the nation, and finished the 2011 season ranked #12. Oregon State played an undefeated regular season in 2012 and was champion of the Northwest conference in 2012, qualifying for the playoffs for the national DI-AA championship.

Disc golf 
Founded in 2011, the disc golf club competes in the Oregon Collegiate Disc Golf League and in March 2019 placed 10th at the National Collegiate Disc Golf Championships in Appling, Georgia.

Indoor rock climbing
The indoor rock climbing club was formed in 2015 as a club sport at OSU. The climbing club competes against other schools in the Pacific Northwest as part of the Northwest Collegiate Climbing Circuit (NC3).

Bass fishing
The Oregon State bass fishing team was founded in 2012.

Beaver Nation

Oregon State University's proud fans, alumni, and supporters are commonly referred to as Beaver Nation by the media and are credited with giving the Beavers a great home field/court advantage at all of OSU's sporting events. Reser Stadium, Gill Coliseum, and Goss Stadium at Coleman Field are regularly filled by fans dressed in the school colors, creating an intimidating sea of orange and black that loudly cheer on the Beavers.

Beaver Nation has also developed a very attractive reputation for "traveling well" to support its various teams, with large numbers of orange and black clad fans following the Beavers to away games, bowl games, and tournaments.

Some of the most prominent events showcasing OSU's rabid fan support and willingness to travel include the 2001 Fiesta Bowl, 2012 Alamo Bowl, 2016 Women's Final Four, and College World Series tournaments in 2005, 2006, 2007, 2013, 2017, and 2018. In 2000, Oregon State's football team finished with a 10–1 regular season record and an invitation to the 2001 Fiesta Bowl. The Beavers football team brought an estimated 38,000 fans with them to Tempe, Arizona and went on to crush Notre Dame by a score of 42–3. In June 2006 and again in June 2007, Oregon State's baseball team made consecutive trips to Omaha, Nebraska for the College World Series. Beaver Nation showed up by the thousands, creating large pockets of its dominating orange at Rosenblatt Stadium, and cheered the team on to the National Championship both years. The fan base showed up big again in Omaha for the 2018 College World Series, celebrating wildly as the Beavers took home yet another National Championship, this time at TD Ameritrade Stadium.

Beaver Sports Radio Network
The Beaver Sports Radio Network members broadcast a number of Beaver athletic events. Mike Parker is the primary announcer and has been the voice of the Beavers since 1999. The members as of February 1, 2012 include:

*Football Only
**Women's Basketball Only
***Baseball Only
^Talk Show Only

See also
Oregon Sports Hall of Fame

References

External links

 

 
College sports in Oregon
Sports in Corvallis, Oregon